The men's freestyle 57 kilograms is a competition featured at the 2015 World Wrestling Championships, and was held in Las Vegas, United States on 12 September.

Results
Legend
F — Won by fall

Finals

Top half

Section 1

Section 2

Bottom half

Section 3

Section 4

Repechage

References
Official website

Men's freestyle 57 kg